Salvatore Achille Ettore Lima (23 January 1928 – 12 March 1992) was an Italian politician from Sicily who was associated with, and murdered by, the Sicilian Mafia. He is often just referred to as Salvo Lima. According to the pentito (Mafia defector) Tommaso Buscetta, Lima's father, Vincenzo Lima, was a member of the Mafia but is not known whether Lima himself was a "made member" of Cosa Nostra. In the final report of the first Italian Antimafia Commission (1963–1976), Lima was described as one of the pillars of Mafia power in Palermo.

During his long career with the Christian Democracy (DC) that began in the 1950s, Lima was first allied with the faction of Amintore Fanfani and after 1964 with the one of Giulio Andreotti, seven times prime minister and a member of almost every post-war Italian government. That shift earned him a seat in the national parliament in 1968. Lima was often referred to as Andreotti's "proconsul" on Sicily. Under Andreotti, Lima once held a cabinet post. At the time of his death, he was a member of the European Parliament. Lima rarely spoke in public or campaigned during elections but usually would manage to gain large support from seemingly nowhere when it came to voting day.

Mayor of Palermo
From 1958 to 1963, Lima was mayor of Palermo, his birthplace, while his fellow Christian Democrat Vito Ciancimino was assessor for public works. Between 1951 and 1961 the population of Palermo had risen by 100,000. Under Lima and Ciancimino an unprecedented construction boom hit the city. They supported Mafia-allied building contractors such as Palermo’s leading construction entrepreneur Francesco Vassallo – a former cart driver hauling sand and stone in a poor district of Palermo. Vassallo was connected to mafiosi like Angelo La Barbera and Tommaso Buscetta. In five years, over 4,000 building licences were signed, more than half of them in the names of three pensioners who had no connection with construction at all.

This period was later referred to as the "Sack of Palermo" because the construction boom led to the destruction of the city's green belt, and villas that gave it architectural grace, to make way for characterless and shoddily constructed apartment blocks. In the meantime Palermo’s historical centre was allowed to crumble. In 1964, during an investigation, Lima had to admit that he knew Angelo La Barbera, one of Palermo's most powerful mobsters. Lima's election was supported by the La Barbera clan. From 1965-1968 Lima again was mayor of Palermo.

Lima arranged an unusually lucrative concession to collect taxes in Sicily to Antonio Salvo and Ignazio Salvo, two wealthy mafia-cousins from the town of Salemi in the province of Trapani, in exchange for their loyalty to Salvo Lima and the Andreotti faction of the DC. The Salvo’s were allowed 10 percent of the take – three times as much as the national average of 3.3 percent.

Early Mafia connections
According to the "pentito" (Mafia defector) Tommaso Buscetta, Vincenzo Lima (Lima’s father) was a "man of honour" of the Palermo Centro Mafia family that was led by Salvatore and Angelo La Barbera of which Buscetta's family – the Porta Nuova Mafia family – was part as well. The La Barbera brothers helped Salvo Lima in getting elected. Buscetta himself met Salvo Lima many times and they became good friends. Every year Lima provided Buscetta with tickets for the Teatro Massimo in Palermo.

At the time, the public and authorities did not know these connections. Buscetta only revealed facts about the relations between mafiosi and politicians after judge Giovanni Falcone was killed in 1992. However, already in 1964 one of Falcone’s predecessors, judge Cesare Terranova, unequivocally demonstrated Lima’s connections with the La Barberas. In an indictment in 1964, Terranova wrote: "it is clear that Angelo and Salvatore La Barbera (well-known bosses in the Palermo area) ... knew former mayor Salvatore Lima and maintained relations in such a way as to ask for favours. ...  The undeniable contacts of the La Barbera mafiosi with the one who was the first citizen of Palermo ... constitute a confirmation of ... the infiltration of the Mafia in several sectors of public life." Nevertheless, Lima was allowed to continue in politics as if nothing had happened.

Alliance with Andreotti

In 1968 Lima was elected to the Chamber of Deputies (Italian: Camera dei Deputati), suddenly surpassing established politicians in Sicily. The alliance between Lima and Andreotti proved beneficial to both. Although Andreotti had a strong electoral base in and around Rome, his faction had no power base in the rest of Italy. With Lima, who at some time controlled 25 percent of all party members in Sicily, the Andreotti faction turned into a truly national group. While Andreotti had been an important government minister before his alliance with Lima, he now became one of the most powerful politicians in Italy. Andreotti became prime minister for the first time in 1972. In 1974 Lima became Under-Secretary of the Budget. In 1979 Lima was elected in the European Parliament.

In 1981, Palermo witnessed the outbreak of a bloody Mafia war. A new dominant group within the Mafia, headed by Salvatore (Totò) Riina, of Corleone, killed and replaced the traditional bosses of Palermo and their associates. The Corleonesi also turned against state representatives and politicians, such as the communist senator Pio La Torre, the Carabinieri general Carlo Alberto Dalla Chiesa who had been appointed as the prefect of Palermo to fight the Mafia, and Rocco Chinnici, chief prosecutor in Palermo.

A mounting public outcry demanded the Christian Democrats to clean up its house in Sicily. The mayor of Palermo, one of Lima's protégés, was forced to resign, and Andreotti's Sicilian faction was on the defensive. At the Maxi Trial against the Mafia in the mid 1980s, two of Lima's closest allies, the cousins Nino and Ignazio Salvo, were convicted as members of the Mafia. When Lima was in Sicily he was allowed to use the bulletproof car of the Salvo’s. Lima himself, however, was never part of a criminal investigation, because of the unwillingness of both witnesses and prosecutors.

Mafia boss Tommaso Buscetta, whose testimonies as a collaborating witness during the Maxi Trial had been instrumental in convicting many Mafia bosses, refused to talk about the relationship between Cosa Nostra and politicians. He told Giovanni Falcone one of the prosecutors at the Maxi Trial: "I have told you repeatedly that I would not discuss it until and if the time is ripe. It would be extremely foolish to discuss this subject - which is the crucial knot of the Mafia problem - while the very people whom we would be discussing remain fully active on the political scene."

The Court of Cassation (court of final appeal) ruled in October 2004 that Andreotti had "friendly and even direct ties" with top men in the so-called moderate wing of Cosa Nostra, Stefano Bontade and Gaetano Badalamenti, favoured by the connection between them and Salvo Lima.

Murder

On 12 March 1992, 64-year-old Salvo Lima was on his way to Palermo in his chauffeur driven car when his tires were shot by a hitman on a motorcycle. After his car screeched to a halt, Lima scrambled out and attempted to flee, but the hitman got off the motorbike, shot Lima in the back and then ran over and finished him off with a bullet to the neck. The hitman then sped away.

The killing took place three weeks before Italy's national election, billed as a watershed in Italian politics. The murder of Lima meant a turning point in the relations between the Mafia and its reference points in politics. The Mafia felt betrayed by Lima and Andreotti. In their opinion they had failed to block the confirmation of the sentence of the Maxi Trial by the Court of Cassation (court of final appeal) in January 1992, which upheld the Buscetta theorem that Cosa Nostra was a single hierarchical organisation ruled by a Commission and that its leaders could be held responsible for criminal acts that were committed to benefit the organisation. In September 1992, the Mafia murdered Ignazio Salvo, the prominent Mafia businessman who had been close to Lima.

The Mafia had counted on Lima and Andreotti to appoint Corrado Carnevale to review the sentence. Carnevale, known as "the sentence killer", had overturned many Mafia convictions on the slenderest of technicalities previously. Carnevale, however, had to withdraw due to pressure from the public and from Giovanni Falcone – who at the time had moved to the ministry of Justice. Falcone was backed by the minister of Justice Claudio Martelli despite the fact that he served under Prime Minister Andreotti.

In 1998, several Mafia bosses were sentenced to life in prison for Lima's murder, including Salvatore Riina.

Tommaso Buscetta, moved by the deaths of Falcone and Borsellino, decided to break his long silence on ties between politics and Cosa Nostra. He acknowledged that he had known Lima since the late 1950s. On 16 November 1992 Buscetta testified before the Antimafia Commission presided by Luciano Violante about the links between Cosa Nostra and Salvo Lima and Giulio Andreotti. He indicated Salvo Lima as the contact of the Mafia in Italian politics. "Salvo Lima was, in fact, the politician to whom Cosa Nostra turned most often to resolve problems for the organisation whose solution lay in Rome," Buscetta testified. Other collaborating witnesses confirmed that Lima had been specifically ordered to "fix" the appeal of the Maxi Trial with Italy's Court of Cassation and had been murdered because he failed to do so.

"I knew that for any problems requiring a solution in Rome, Lima was the man we turned to," according to another pentito Gaspare Mutolo. "Lima was killed because he did not uphold, or couldn’t uphold, the commitments he had made in Palermo (…) The verdict of the Supreme Court was a disaster. After the Supreme Court verdict we felt we were lost. That verdict was like a dose of poison for the mafiosi, who felt like wounded animals. That’s why they carried out the massacres. Something had to happen. I was surprised when people who had eight years of a prison sentence still to serve started giving themselves up. Then they killed Lima and I understood." According to Mutolo, "Lima was killed because he was the greatest symbol of that part of the political world which, after doing favours for Cosa Nostra in exchange for its votes, was no longer able to protect the interests of the organisation at the time of its most important trial."

Legacy
Most sources regard the allegations of Lima being tied to the Mafia as true, although it must be pointed out that he was never formally charged or convicted of such allegations. In 1993 the Antimafia Commission led by senator Luciano Violante concluded that there were strong indications of relations between Lima and members of Cosa Nostra.

"Lima became the prisoner of a system," according to the pentito Leonardo Messina. "Before this latest generation, being a friend of mafiosi was easy for everybody… It was a great honour for a mafioso to have a member of parliament at a wedding or a baptism… When a mafioso saw a parliamentarian he would take off his hat and offer him a seat." With the rise of power of the Corleonesi this changed profoundly. "Now, it has become an imposition: do this or else," Messina said.

In 1998, in the trial for the murder of Lima, Giuseppe Calò, Francesco Madonia, Bernardo Brusca, Salvatore Riina, Giuseppe Graviano, Pietro Aglieri, Salvatore Montalto, Giuseppe Montalto, Salvatore Buscemi, Nenè Geraci, Raffaele Ganci, Giuseppe Farinella, Benedetto Spera, Antonino Giuffrè, Salvatore Biondino, Michelangelo La Barbera, and Simone Scalici were sentenced to life imprisonment, while Salvatore Cancemi and Giovanni Brusca were sentenced to 18 years in prison and the collaborators of Justice Francesco Onorato and Giovan Battista Ferrante (who confessed to the crime) were sentenced to 13 years as material perpetrators of the ambush. In 2003, the Cassation annulled the sentence to life imprisonment for Pietro Aglieri, Giuseppe Farinella, Giuseppe Graviano and Benedetto Spera.

Electoral history

References

Dickie, John (2004). Cosa Nostra. A history of the Sicilian Mafia, London: Coronet, 
Jamieson, Alison (2000), The Antimafia. Italy’s Fight Against Organized Crime, London: MacMillan Press 
Schneider, Jane T. & Peter T. Schneider (2003). Reversible Destiny: Mafia, Antimafia, and the Struggle for Palermo, Berkeley: University of California Press 
Servadio Gaia (1976). Mafioso. A history of the Mafia from its origins to the present day, London: Secker & Warburg 
Stille, Alexander (1995). Excellent Cadavers. The Mafia and the Death of the First Italian Republic, New York: Vintage

External links
Salvatore Lima's European Parliament page
 Sentenza Cassazione omicidio Lima

1928 births
1992 deaths
Christian Democracy (Italy) politicians
Mayors of Palermo
People murdered by the Corleonesi
Assassinated Sicilian politicians
People murdered in Italy
MEPs for Italy 1979–1984